Something Different is a 1963 Czechoslovak film directed by Věra Chytilová. The film intersperses two separate narratives: one following Vera, a fictional housewife living in Czechoslovakia, and another following Eva, an Olympic gymnast played by real-life Olympic gold medalist Eva Bosáková.

Chytilová's first feature-length film, it is regarded as one of the breakout films of the Czech New Wave, as well as an early example of women's cinema in the Eastern Bloc. While not as well known as some of Chytilová's other films such as Daisies and Fruit of Paradise, it won the main prize at the 1963 Mannheim Film Festival, and has been praised by both contemporary critics and 21st century retrospectives, in addition to receiving a fair amount of attention in academic film literature.

Background 
Released in 1963, Something Different was one of the first films of the Czech New Wave, and Chytilová's first feature-length film. Chytilová was one of the only women filmmakers who participated in the Czech New Wave, and Something Different, like many other of the entries in her filmography, focuses on women's lives and challenges in Czechoslovakia.

Style and synopsis 
Something Different merges documentary-style footage of Eva, a Czechoslovakian gymnast played by real-life Olympic gold-medalist Eva Bosáková, as she endures incessant training in preparation for a competition. These scenes are juxtaposed against a narrative following the fictional housewife Vera, who is discontented and overwhelmed by housework as she struggles to take care of her misbehaving son and her inattentive husband, eventually resorting to a similarly unsatisfying affair. The only scene in which the two women's lives intersect is at a game of cards at the beginning of the film––otherwise, the two narratives are tied together only implicitly and thematically.

After many scenes of Eva enduring grueling and humiliating training sessions, the film includes scenes of her actually performing her routine at a competition, and a final shot of her working as a gymnastics instructor for a younger woman. Meanwhile, Vera's marriage almost collapses as her husband reveals that he is also having an affair, and tells her that they should divorce, although a final scene shows her together with family, if still less than happy.

Analysis 
Something Different has been described as a cinematic breakthrough alongside Black Peter and The Cry, discarding the morality tales of earlier socialist cinema and replacing them with frank depictions of everyday life, in addition to breaking with other traditional conventions of film form.

In an overview of Chytilová's early career, Jiří Ceslar, professor of film at the Faculty of Arts, Charles University in Prague, describes the film as a meditation on the meaning of life, expressed through Eva and Vera's lines which are on one hand trivial everyday phrases and on the other hand appear to have metaphorical importance as commentary on life's struggles; these statements also carry a theme set in the film's title, as they are always "about something different". While the film invites the viewer to draw connections between Vera and Eva's lives through their narrative juxtaposition, scholars have also noted the stark difference in the nature of Eva and Vera's problems: where Eva is constrained by an extremely rigid regime of exercise, Vera is vexed by a lack of direction.

Something Different is also contrasted against Chytilová's following two films, 1965's Pearls of the Deep and 1966's Daisies. In particular, the three films display a progression in Chytilová's use of structure, with Pearls of the Deep as a stepping stone between the tightly structured Something Different and the anarchic Daisies. Similarly, Something Different is an example of Chytilová's use of the style of cinema verite in her early career, contrasted against more allegorical works such as Daisies and Fruit of Paradise.

Reception 
A contemporary review in Le Monde praised Chytilová's humor and virtuoso technique. The film won the main prize at the Mannheim Film Festival in 1963.

The film has also received renewed attention from Anglophone critics in the 21st century. A review by The Arts Desk of a DVD release of the film in 2016 praised the film's ability to avoid pretentiousness, thanks to the work of the Chytilová, Curík, Slitr, and Hájek. A review in The New Yorker called it "radically and thrillingly different from more or less any film that was being made at the time", praising its camerawork and subject matter. A review in Hyperallergic described the film as "subtle and poignant".

References

External links 

 Something Different on IMDb
 Something Different on the Criterion Channel

1963 films
Czech drama films
Films directed by Věra Chytilová
1960s Czech-language films